Seyfabad (also Romanized as Seyfābād; also known as Saifābād and Seyfābād-e Now) is a village in Balyan Rural District, in the Central District of Kazerun County, Fars Province, Iran. At the 2006 census, its population was 2,004, in 441 families.

References 

Populated places in Kazerun County